Vulbi Landscape Conservation Area is a nature reserve situated in Järva County, Estonia.

Its area is 11 ha.

The protected area was designated in 1993 to protect esker areas in Albu and Ambla Parish. In 2017, the protected area was redesigned to the landscape conservation area.

References

Nature reserves in Estonia
Geography of Järva County